Jean-Jacob Jeudy (born in Port au Prince, Haiti, February 7, 1970) is a soldier in the United States Army, having previously worked as a journalist, activist and politician.

Jeudy was born into poverty, and comes from a very large family of 16 children. He was educated at the Jacques Vital Herne and Nelson Mandela High School in Port au Prince, graduating with honors in 1990. While at the high school he worked as a broadcast journalist at Radio Cacique, a popular Haitian radio station which aired news and documentaries opposed to the military government in place at the time. He was aged 17 at the time, one of the youngest journalists to have worked at the station. Jeudy attended State University of Haiti where he received a Bachelor of Science in Journalism.

In 1991, after the coup d'état against President Jean Bertrand Aristide, Jeudy was forced into hiding. In 1992, he joined another famous Haitian radio station, Radio Caraïbes, where he became director of news. In 1994, he was forced into exile in the United States.

In 1996, he joined the United States Army, where he works as an Army Logistic Specialist. In 1999, he became a naturalized citizen of the United States. In October 2008, he became an Army Officer in the communication field.

References

External links
https://web.archive.org/web/20100128051447/http://www2.wjbf.com/jbf/news/world/article/fort_gordon_soldier_talks_about_loss_of_family_members_in_haiti_earthquake/52817
http://chronicle.augusta.com/stories/2010/01/20/met_563932.shtml
http://www.wrdw.com/home/headlines/81374722.html
http://www.military.com/news/article/soldier-loses-7-haitian-family-members.html

Haitian emigrants to the United States
Haitian political journalists
1970 births
Living people